The St. Croix Soccer League is a regional soccer championship played in Saint Croix, United States Virgin Islands. The two best teams of the championship qualifies to US Virgin Islands Championship.

St. Croix Soccer League - Clubs 2012/13
Chelsea
Free Will Baptist
Helenites
Prankton United
Rovers
Skills
Unique FC

Previous winners
1968/69: Hess Oil Company
1969/92: unknown
1992/93: Rovers SC
1993/94: unknown
1994/95: Rovers SC
1995/96: Rovers SC
1997/98: Helenites (Groveplace)
1998/99: Unique FC (Christiansted)
1999/00: Helenites (Groveplace)
2000/01: Helenites (Groveplace) (or not held?)
2001/02: Helenites (Groveplace)
2002/03: Helenites (Groveplace)
2003/04: Helenites (Groveplace)
2004/05: Helenites (Groveplace)
2005/06: Helenites (Groveplace)
2006/07: Helenites (Groveplace)
2007/08: Helenites (Groveplace)
2008/09: Helenites (Groveplace)
2009/10: Unique FC (Christiansted)
2010/11: Helenites (Groveplace)
2011/12: Helenites (Groveplace)
2012/13: Rovers
2013/14: Helenites (Groveplace)
2014/15: Helenites (Groveplace)
2015/16: Helenites (Groveplace)
2016/17: Helenites (Groveplace)

External links
US Virgin Islands - List of Champions, RSSSF.com

2
Second level football leagues in the Caribbean